Campbell Cotts (21 April 190219 February 1964) was a Cape Colony-born actor of British stage, film and television. A former barrister and a published poet, Cotts studied at Cambridge and fought in Second World War, attaining the rank of 1st Lieutenant in the Black Watch (Royal Highland Regiment). His acting roles included a Broadway appearance opposite Katharine Hepburn in a revival of Shaw's The Millionairess at the Shubert Theatre in 1952.

Selected filmography
 Fame Is the Spur (1947)
 The Brass Monkey (1948)
 The Idol of Paris (1948)
 Trottie True (1949)
 Stop Press Girl (1949)
 Dear Mr. Prohack (1949)
 Last Holiday (1950)
 The Angel with the Trumpet (1950)
 My Seal and Them (1951)
 The Hour of 13 (1952)
 Barbados Quest (1955)
 Three Men in a Boat (1956)
 Just My Luck (1957)
 The Good Companions (1957)

References

Bibliography
 Steve Chibnall. J. Lee Thompson. Manchester University Press, 2000.

External links

1902 births
1964 deaths
Baronets in the Baronetage of the United Kingdom
British male stage actors
British male film actors
British male television actors
South African male stage actors
South African male film actors
South African male television actors
South African emigrants to the United Kingdom